Mount Lupa is a flat-topped, ice-covered mountain, over  high, standing between Romulus Glacier and Martin Glacier close east-southeast of Black Thumb and  east of the head of Rymill Bay, on the west coast of Graham Land, Antarctica. It was first roughly surveyed in 1936 by the British Graham Land Expedition under John Rymill. It was resurveyed in 1948–49 by the Falkland Islands Dependencies Survey who applied the name. This mountain lies near the heads of Romulus and Remus Glaciers, and the name derives from the mythological story of the she-wolf (Lupa) which fed the twins Romulus and Remus after they had been thrown into the Tiber.

References

Mountains of Graham Land
Fallières Coast